Nans-sous-Sainte-Anne (literally Nans under Sainte-Anne) is a commune in the Doubs department in the Bourgogne-Franche-Comté region in eastern France.

Geography
Nans is known for its spectacular geological features, including the Source de Lison, the Via Ferrata and the Grotte Serazin. The artist Gustave Courbet was active in the area. His depiction of the Grotte Serazin hangs in the Getty Museum in Los Angeles, California, and his painting of the Source de Lison is in the Alte Nationalegalerie in Berlin. Nans is also home to the historical Tillandiarie, a 16th-century water-powered workshop.

Population

See also
 Communes of the Doubs department

References

External links

 Nans-sous-Sainte-Anne on the intercommunal Web site of the department 

Communes of Doubs